Lázaro Robersy Armenteros Arango (born May 22, 1999), nicknamed Lazarito, is a Cuban professional baseball outfielder in the Oakland Athletics organization.

Career
Armenteros played in the 2014 15U Baseball World Cup, held in Mexico, and made the All-Tournament Team after batting .462 in nine games.

In 2015, Armenteros was sanctioned by the Cuban government, and disallowed from playing for the 15-and-under team. Armenteros defected from Cuba in an attempt to play in Major League Baseball. He reached Haiti, and established residency there in May 2015. He permanently settled in the Dominican Republic. A team in Nippon Professional Baseball reportedly offered Armenteros a contract worth $15 million. In January 2016, Armenteros was declared a free agent.

On July 2, 2016, he signed a minor league contract with the Oakland Athletics. He made his American professional baseball debut in 2017 with both the DSL Athletics and AZL Athletics, slashing .276/.377/.443 with four home runs, 23 RBIs, and 12 stolen bases in 47 games between the two teams. 

The Athletics assigned him to the Beloit Snappers of the Class A Midwest League in 2018, and to the Stockton Ports of the Class A-Advanced California League in 2019. In 2019 he led the minor leagues in strikeouts, with 227 in 459 at bats.

Personal life
Armenteros was born and raised in the San Miguel del Padrón section of Havana. He has three brothers and three sisters. His father, Lazaro Sr., played for the Cuban national basketball team.

References

External links

1999 births
Living people
Baseball players from Havana
Defecting Cuban baseball players
Dominican Summer League Athletics players
Cuban expatriate baseball players in the Dominican Republic
Arizona League Athletics players
Beloit Snappers players
Stockton Ports players
Cuban expatriate baseball players in the United States